Revella Eudosia Hughes (July 27, 1895 – October 24, 1987) was an American singer, musician and recording artist. She was one of the best known and most successful African-American sopranos of the first half of the 20th century.

Early life
Hughes was born in Huntington, West Virginia, United States. Her parents were George and Anna B. Page Hughes. Her musical education began at the age of five with piano and singing lessons. She earned a diploma from Hartshorn Memorial College in 1909 and she later learned the violin while attending Douglass High School from where she graduated in 1915. She received a Bachelor of Music degree from Howard University in 1917.

Career
Hughes began her professional career in New York City in 1920, where she appeared several Broadway shows featuring Paul Robeson, Marian Anderson and Roland Hayes. In 1923, she was made choral director for the  Broadway revue Shuffle Along. During the 1920s she appeared on radio and on stage, working on the B.F. Keith circuit in her home town of Huntington, and at the Regal Theater in Chicago.

After a substantial career as a soprano, Hughes began composing and arranging on the Hammond organ, creating a live-performance compilation she titled "An Informal Hour of Music." In 1953, Hughes toured Europe and the Middle East doing U.S.O. shows, where she played the organ and was musical arranger for Gypsy Markoff.

After retiring in 1955, Hughes was brought back to the spotlight for a round of performances connected with the Universal Jazz Coalition festival in 1980.

Personal life
While at Howard, Hughes met Layton Wheaton, son of lawyer John Francis Wheaton, who became a dentist. They were married in 1920 and divorced in 1923. In 1932, she had returned to Huntington to take care of her widowed mother. Her mother's death led her to stop singing for a while, which brought about her extensive work with the Hammond organ.

She died in New York in 1987 at the age of 91.

References

1895 births
1987 deaths
20th-century American singers
20th-century American women singers
20th-century African-American women singers
American sopranos
Howard University alumni
Musicians from Huntington, West Virginia